To. Jenny is 2018 South Korean television series starring Kim Sung-cheol and Jung Chae-yeon. It aired on KBS2's Tuesdays at 23:00 (KST) time slot from July 10–18, 2018.

Synopsis
To. Jenny is a music drama about a young man who expresses his unrequited first love for a girl through music and a young woman who chases after her dream despite a harsh situation.

Cast

Main
 Kim Sung-cheol as Park Jung-min, an aspiring singer-songwriter who has suffered from stage phobia ever since his voice cracked in front of his first love.
 Jung Chae-yeon as Kwon Na-ra, a member of an unsuccessful girl group on the brink of obscurity who is attempting to revive her career.

Supporting
 Choi Yoo-ri as Park Ok-hee, Jung-min's younger sister.
 Park Mi-sun as Kim Mi-ok, Jung-min's mother.
 Yang Ik-june as Kim Hyung-soo, Jung-min's uncle.
 Lee Sang-yi as Yeom Dae-sung, Jung-min's friend.
 Nam Tae-boo as Kim Min-bong, Jung-min's friend.
 Jo Kwan-woo as the CEO of Kwon Na-ra's agency
 NC.A as Eileen, a rival singer at Kwon Na-ra's agency
 Kim Junwook as a performer
 Jeong Sagang as a performer

Soundtrack
The original soundtrack for the television series was released in two installments on July 11 and 18, 2018. It consists of diegetic music performed and written in-universe by series protagonist Park Jung-min. In reality, these songs (with the exception of original song "To. Jenny") are covers of existing songs by Korean indie artists performed by the show's cast.

Track listing

Ratings

References

External links
  
 
 
 

Korean Broadcasting System television dramas
Korean-language television shows
2018 South Korean television series debuts
2018 South Korean television series endings
South Korean romance television series
South Korean musical television series